Jack Deas (5 November 1875 – 23 August 1949) was an Australian rules footballer who played for the South Melbourne Football Club, Fitzroy Football Club and Essendon Football Club in the Victorian Football League (VFL).

Deas, who was a defender, started his career at South Melbourne in 1897 but only managed two appearances. He did not play again until 1899, now with Fitzroy, and was a half back flanker in their premiership side that year. After a further two seasons at Fitzroy he crossed to Essendon where he played one final season.

References

Holmesby, Russell and Main, Jim (2007). The Encyclopedia of AFL Footballers. 7th ed. Melbourne: Bas Publishing.
Essendon Football Club profile

1875 births
Australian rules footballers from Victoria (Australia)
Sydney Swans players
Fitzroy Football Club players
Fitzroy Football Club Premiership players
Essendon Football Club players
1949 deaths
One-time VFL/AFL Premiership players